Durga Murmu is an Indian politician. He was elected to the West Bengal Legislative Assembly from Phansidewa as a member of the Bharatiya Janata Party. He defeated Choton Kisku of All India Trinamool Congress by 27,711 votes in 2021 West Bengal Assembly election.

References 

Living people
Year of birth missing (living people)
21st-century Indian politicians
People from Darjeeling district
Bharatiya Janata Party politicians from West Bengal
West Bengal MLAs 2021–2026
Indian politicians